Christopher James Baker is an Australian actor known for his work as Henry King Sr. / Brainwave in the DC Universe series Stargirl.

Early life
Baker grew up in Australia. Raised by parents Maggie Baker and John Baker. In his early life, he lived in the United Kingdom before returning to Australia.

Career

In 2014, Baker played a secondary character in the second season of True Detective. He played the assistant of Vince Vaughan's character.

In 2017, the actor played Boyd Langmore in Netflix's hit series, Ozark.

Baker appeared on the 2019 season of Agents of S.H.I.E.L.D. as the Chronicom Hunter Malachi.

In 2020, Baker was cast as Brainwave in Stargirl.

Filmography

Film

Television

References

External links

Australian television actors
Living people
Year of birth missing (living people)